Hoxie High School is an accredited public high school in Hoxie, Arkansas, United States. Hoxie High School is one of five public high schools in Lawrence County and the only high school of the Hoxie School District.

Academics
The assumed course of study follows the Smart Core curriculum developed by the Arkansas Department of Education (ADE). Students complete regular coursework and exams and may select Advanced Placement (AP) courses and exams that may lead to college credit. Hoxie High School is accredited by the ADE and has been accredited by AdvancED since 1975.

Athletics 
The Hoxie High School mascot is the mustang with green and white serving as the school colors.

For 2012–14, the Hoxie Mustangs compete in the 3A Classification from the 3A Region 3 Conference administered by the Arkansas Activities Association. The Mustangs participate in football, volleyball, golf (boys/girls), cheer, dance, basketball (boys/girls), baseball, softball, track (boys/girls).  On March 10, 2017, the Hoxie Lady Mustangs won the Class 3A Basketball Tournament.

References

External links
 

Public high schools in Arkansas
Schools in Lawrence County, Arkansas